Dal Konstantinovich Orlov (10 February 1935 – 24 February 2021) was a Russian film critic, journalist, and screenwriter.

Biography
He was the son of the political officer of the Red Army Konstantin Vasilyevich Orlov and Asya Grigorievna Itsikson. In 1941, the family moved to Irkutsk, and then to Asino the following year. His mother moved to Kustanay to spend time with her brother, who was Editor-in-Chief of the newspaper .

Orlov finished secondary school in Moscow in 1952 and graduated from Moscow State University in 1957 with a degree in philology. From 1958 to 1969, he worked for the newspaper Trud before serving as Deputy Editor-in-Chief of the film magazine Iskusstvo Kino. He also served as Editor-in-Chief of Soviet Screen from 1978 to 1986. From 1980 to 1986, he hosted the television show . He was the Moscow correspondent of the newspaper .

Dal Orlov died in Moscow on 24 February 2021 at the age of 86.

Screenwriting
Leader (1984)
Hard to Be a God (1989)

Personal life 
Dal's wife was Elena Izergina-Orlova, a fashion model and theater critic.

References

External links

1935 births
2021 deaths
Russian film critics
Russian journalists
20th-century Russian screenwriters
Male screenwriters
20th-century Russian male writers
People from Primorsky Krai
Soviet film critics
Soviet journalists
Soviet screenwriters
Soviet dramatists and playwrights
Russian dramatists and playwrights
Soviet magazine editors